Trachselwald District was a district in the canton of Bern, Switzerland. Its governor's seat was in Trachselwald Castle in Trachselwald. It consisted of 10 municipalities within an area of 191 km².

External links 
 Official website of the district

References 

Former districts of the canton of Bern